Simon I (1076 – 13 or 14 January 1139) was the duke of Lorraine from 1115 to his death, the eldest son and successor of Theodoric II and Hedwig of Formbach and a half-brother of Emperor Lothair III.

Continuing the policy of friendship with the Holy Roman Emperor, he accompanied the Emperor Henry V to the Diet of Worms of 1122, where the Investiture Controversy was resolved.

He had stormy relations with the episcopates of his realm: fighting with Stephen of Bar, bishop of Metz, and Adalberon, archbishop of Trier, both allies of the count of Bar, whose claim to Lorraine against Simon's father had been quashed by Henry V's father Henry IV. Though Adalberon excommunicated him, Pope Innocent II lifted it. He was a friend of Bernard of Clairvaux and he built many abbeys in his duchy, including that of Sturzelbronn in 1135.  There was he interred after his original burial in Saint-Dié.

Children of Simon and Adelaide
Simon I of Lorraine married Adelaide, daughter of Henry III of Leuven. Their children were:
 Matthias, his successor in Lorraine
 Robert, lord of Floranges (near Thionville)
 Agatha of Lorraine, married Reginald III, Count of Burgundy (Renaud III), the first Free Count
 Hedwige, married Frederick III, count of Toul
 Bertha, married Margrave Hermann III of Baden
 Mathilde, married Gottfried I, Count of Sponheim
 Baldwin
 John

See also
 House of Lorraine

References 

 Ancestral Roots of Certain American Colonists Who Came to America Before 1700 by Frederick Lewis Weis, Line 45-26

Sources

External links
  genealogie-mittelalter.de

Dukes of Upper Lorraine
1076 births
1139 deaths
People temporarily excommunicated by the Catholic Church